The thirteenth Kerala legislative assembly election was held on 13 April 2011 to elect members representing 140 constituencies in Kerala. Election results were released on 13 May 2011. The election, whose results were released on 13 May 2011, proved to be one of the closest ones in Kerala's history, with the United Democratic Front (UDF) beating the Left Democratic Front (LDF) by a margin of 4 seats.

Oommen Chandy was sworn in as the Chief Minister for the second time on 18 May 2011.

Parties and coalitions
There are three major political coalitions in Kerala. The United Democratic Front (UDF) is the coalition of centrist and centre-left parties led by the Indian National Congress. The Left Democratic Front (LDF) is the coalition of leftwing and far-left parties, led by the Communist Party of India (Marxist) (CPI-M). The right-wing Bharatiya Janata Party (BJP) is also contested in the state and fielded candidates in 139 constituencies, with one seat to their NDA alliance partner Janata Dal (United).

United Democratic Front

Left Democratic Front

Third Front

Other Parties
The Bahujan Samaj Party (BSP) is contesting in all the 140 seats.

The All India Anna Dravida Munnetra Kazhagam (AIADMK) contests in 6 seats in the state.

The Socialist Unity Centre of India (Communist) (SUCI) is contesting in 26 seats.

The Social Democratic Party of India (SDPI) fielded candidates in 84 constituencies.

The Shiv Sena is contesting 44 seats, without any alliance with the BJP.

Seat allotment

Common election symbols are provided only to national parties and registered recognized state parties.
Registered unrecognized parties are given free symbols as per availability, based on request.

UDF

The Indian Union Muslim League contests the elections as Muslim League Kerala State Committee.

LDF

§ R. Selvaraj won the election as a Communist Party of India (Marxist) (CPI (M)) candidate but later resigned and won again from Neyyanttinkara Constituency in the by-election

The official constituency-wise list of candidates with their election symbols

Constituencies
There are 140 constituencies in Kerala, spread over 14 districts, based on the Delimitation commission of 2002.
Many constituencies present in the 2006 elections become non-existent and 24 new constituencies came into existence following the delimitation.

 Kanhangad
 Mattannur
 Dharmadam
 Kalliasseri
 Elathur
 Kuttiady
 Eranad
 Vallikkunnu
 Kottakkal
 Vengara
 Thavanur
 Kongad
 Tarur
 Shornur
 Kaipamangalam
 Puthukkad
 Kalamassery
 Kochi
 Thrikkakara
 Vattiyoorkavu
 Aruvikkara
 Nemom
 Kattakkada
 Thiruvananthapuram

Aranmula constituency in Pathanamathitta district is the only seat in the state that has over two lakh voters at 203,411. The constituency that has the second-highest number of voters is Sultan Battery in Wayanad district with over 196,078 voters, followed by Kunnathur in Kollam district with over 190,322 voters. Kozhikode South constituency has the fewest voters with 130,254, followed by Ernakulam with 133,398 and Tanur in Malappuram district with 136,183 voters respectively.

Female voters outnumber the male voters in 127 of the 140 assembly seats. The Aranmula constituency has the highest number of female voters in the state, followed by Adoor with 102,336 and Manalur with 102,300 females.

Peerumedu constituency has the most polling booths, with 195 booths.

Thiruvananthapuram district has the largest number of 100 candidates in the fray, the fewest, with 17 candidates, is in Wayanad.

Poonjar constituency has the maximum number of candidates, 13.
The fewest candidates is 4, in the constituencies of Sulthanbathery, Alathur, Malampuzha and Kaduthuruthy.

Campaign

Salient points
V. S. Achuthanandan started the LDF campaign in Malampuzha, Palakkad on 21 March 2011.

An Asianet News journalist was allegedly roughed up by P. Jayarajan, a senior legislator of Kerala's ruling Left Democratic Front after a chat show in Kannur.

The use of a helicopter by KPCC chief Ramesh Chennithala in poll campaign was criticised by LDF.

The Supreme Court upheld the Election Commission's order directing the state government to defer its decision to extend a scheme for providing rice at Rs. 2 per kg to all ration card holders that was announced on the eve of the assembly elections.

Former UDF M.L.A. Sobhana George who gave nomination to contest as an Independent candidate from Chenganoor later withdrew her candidature. Janakeeya Vikasana Munnai leader M. R. Murali also withdrew his nomination from contesting polls in Shoranur.

UDF manifesto
The main promises in the UDF manifesto are:-

 36 lakh jobs for unemployed youth.
 25  kg of rice at Re one a kg rice for Below Poverty Line families and at Rs two per kg to others.
 Farm loans at three percent interest.
 Free bicycles to class X students.
 Setting up of pepper and horticulture boards.
 Back-door appointments to be reconsidered.
 Interest-free loans for purchasing computers and motorbikes for students.
 Making Kochi Metro project a reality.
 Ensuring electricity connections to all households within one year.
 Exploitation by operators of other state lotteries to be stopped.

LDF Manifesto
The main promises in the LDF manifesto are:-
 Increase old age pension from Rs 400 to Rs 1000.
 Creation of 25 lakh jobs in non-farm sectors and increasing the state spending on infrastructure projects.
 A subsidy of Rs 20 per liter for kerosene for the weaker sections.
 Several sops for women and children with various empowerment schemes totaling Rs 7500 crore.
 The maternity leave with the wage for women working in the unorganized sector would be increased to three months from the present one month.
 All the school children would be given a free meal, uniforms, and textbooks.
 A welfare-cum-pension scheme for employees of places of worship of all religions will be introduced.
 The operations of other-state lotteries would be contained while protecting the Kerala state lottery.
 Total electrification of the state in six months.
 Cent percent drinking water supply in five years.

Poll surveys

Election
The thirteenth legislative assembly election was held on 13 April 2011.
The filing of nominations for the elections ended on 26 March 2011. A total of 1373 contestants filed nominations.
The scrutiny of nominations took place on 29 March 2011.
According to the latest revised electoral list, there are a total of 22,878,767 voters, with 11,919,652 women and 10,959,115 men. There are 20,758 polling booths in 11,662 polling locations in the state.

A total of 971 candidates contested the elections, after the withdrawal of nominations closed.

Voting

The polling to elect members of the assembly from the 140 constituencies in Kerala was held successfully on 13 April 2011. 75.12 percent of voter turnout was recorded in the state. The district-wise and constituency-wise polling percentage is as given below.

Re-polling was conducted on two polling stations in the state on 16-April-2011, in the Legislative Assembly constituencies of Pattambi and Chalakkudy.

Results

The Election resulted in a slender victory for the UDF coalition winning 72 out of the 140 assembly seats while the incumbent LDF garnered the remaining 68 seats. The UDF lead was further extended to 73 through the subsequent by-election in Neyyattinkara constituency in which the incumbent MLA, R. Selvaraj, resigned from LDF to join UDF and got re-elected.

Summary of results

By region

By district

Constituency-wise detailed results

Note:-

 (SC) - Constituency reserved for Scheduled caste candidates.
 (ST) - Constituency reserved for Scheduled tribe candidates.

Performance of Political Parties

Performance of Political Fronts

By-elections

1.Piravom
Bye-election was held in Piravom Assembly constituency following the death of sitting MLA and minister T. M. Jacob on 30 October 2011.

2.Neyyattinkara
By-election was held in Neyyattinkara Assembly constituency following the resignation of sitting MLA R. Selvaraj on 9 March 2012.

3.Aruvikkara
Bye-election was held in Aruvikkara Assembly constituency following the death of sitting MLA and SPEAKER G. Karthikeyan on 7 March 2015

* indicates one extra seat won by INC from CPI(M) after by-elections in Neyyatinkara constituency assembly seat sharing post the by-election results:

References

External links
 Kerala-election-2011-ministry
 Kerala-election-2011-candidate-list
 Constituencywise Results: 2011
 Official website of Chief Electoral Officer
 Kerala-election-2011-live-coverage
 Official website for election Results
 Congress limps back to power with fractured majority in Kerala 13 May 2011 Tehelka

2011 State Assembly elections in India
2011